Aphyllorchis anomala, commonly known as the simple pauper orchid, is a leafless terrestrial mycotrophic orchid in the family Orchidaceae. It has up to twenty white flowers with purple markings on a deep purple flowering stem and grows in shady rainforest in tropical north Queensland.

Description 
Aphyllorchis anomala is a leafless terrestrial, mycotrophic herb that has a fleshy, brittle, shiny dark purple flowering stem with between four and twenty white flowers with purple markings. The lateral sepals are a similar size, turn slightly downwards and spread widely apart from each other. The petals are about the same length but slightly narrower and often have twisted tips.

Taxonomy and naming
Aphyllorchis anomala was first formally described in 1965 by Alick William Dockrill who published the description in The Orchadian. The specific epithet (anomala) is derived from the Ancient Greek word anomalos meaning "uneven", "irregular", "inconsistent", "abnormal", "unusual" or "deviating from the regular rule".

Distribution and habitat
The simple pauper orchid grows near sea level in moist, shady rainforest mainly between Rossville and the Atherton Tableland and near Airlie Beach.

References 

anomala
Plants described in 1965
Terrestrial orchids
Orchids of Queensland